Vegreville  is a town in central Alberta, Canada. It was incorporated as a town in 1906, and that year also saw the founding of the Vegreville Observer, a weekly newspaper for the region.

A large percentage of Vegreville's population is of Ukrainian Canadian descent, and it is home to the Vegreville egg, the world's second largest pysanka (Ukrainian Easter egg).

Geography

Climate 
Vegreville experiences a humid continental climate (Köppen climate classification Dfb).

Demographics 

In the 2016 Census of Population conducted by Statistics Canada, the Town of Vegreville recorded a population of 5,708 living in 2,429 of its 2,734 total private dwellings, a  change from its 2011 population of 5,717.

The Town of Vegreville's 2012 municipal census counted a population of 5,758, a 1.3% decrease over its 2010 municipal census population of 5,834.

Age distribution
 0 to 19:  26.3%
 20 to 64: 50.3%
 65+: 23.3%

 Mother tongue
 English: 4,185
 French: 105
 Other: 1,015

Economy 
The primary economic base of the town is agricultural.

Arts and culture 

Due to Vegreville's close relationship with the 41 Combat Engineer Regiment, a Canadian Forces Reserve unit based in Edmonton, the Regiment is the only Canadian Forces unit with Freedom of the Town and parades held on Remembrance Day in the town.

Pysanka Festival 
The Pysanka Festival, founded in 1973, occurs annually during the first weekend of July.

The 2015 festival featured grandstand shows, cultural variety shows, a pioneer village, Ukrainian music, a Zabava (evening Dance) featuring Kolomeyka music, folk arts creating Pysanka (Ukrainian Easter eggs), and a market place.

The festival has hosted the Cheremosh Ukrainian Dance Company, the Ukrainian Male Chorus of Edmonton, and the Kubasonics.

Attractions 

Vegreville's pysanka, the second largest Ukrainian Easter egg in the world, was created to commemorate the 100th anniversary of the Royal Canadian Mounted Police in 1974 and to celebrate Vegreville's ethnic heritage. On July 6, 2009, the pysanka was one of four attractions featured on the first set of the Canadian Roadside Attractions Series of stamps issued by Canada Post.

Media 
Vegreville is serviced by the Vegreville News Advertiser weekly newspaper, an independently-owned newspaper established in 1950.

Infrastructure 
The town is bisected by Canadian National Railway's Vegreville Subdivision, a rail line connecting Vegreville to Edmonton in the west and to Lloydminster in the east.

Notable people 
George Bures Miller, artist
Kyle Brodziak, NHL player
Dennis Kassian, NHL & WHA player
Cam Cole, journalist
Linda Craddock (b. 1952), visual artist
Laurence Decore, Ukrainian Canadian lawyer, former mayor of Edmonton, Alberta, and former leader of the Alberta Liberal Party
Roderick D. Fraser, 11th President of the University of Alberta (1995 - 2005)
Herschel Hardin, writer, playwright, and politician
Simma Holt, journalist, author, former Member of Parliament, and Member of the Order of Canada
Daymond Langkow, former NHL forward
Don Mazankowski, politician and federal Deputy Prime Minister under Brian Mulroney
Virgil P. Moshansky, Ukrainian Canadian jurist and former mayor of Vegreville
David Motiuk, Catholic bishop of Ukrainian Catholic Eparchy of Edmonton
Lillian Sarafinchan, Canadian visual artist, teacher, and production designer
Brent Severyn, former NHL defenseman
Valerie Sweeting, curler

In popular culture 
Season 4, episode 14 of Fox Television's The X-Files series entitled "Memento Mori" references Vegreville. FBI Agent Fox Mulder realizes the town name is the password needed to hack into a computer after discovering a Vegreville pysanka souvenir snow globe on the desk next to the computer.

See also 
List of communities in Alberta
List of towns in Alberta

References

Further reading

External links 

1906 establishments in Alberta
Towns in Alberta
Ukrainian-Canadian culture in Alberta